Doridunculus is a genus of sea slugs, dorid nudibranchs, shell-less marine gastropod mollusks in the family Akiodorididae.

Species 
 Doridunculus echinulatus Sars G. O., 1878
 Doridunculus unicus Martynov & Roginskaya, 2005

References

Akiodorididae